The Mothership Connection — Live from Houston is an album by George Clinton and Parliament-Funkadelic. It was released on the Capitol Records label in the spring of 1986.

The Mothership Connection — Live from Houston is divided evenly between studio and live performances. Side one consists of a live recording made at a concert at The Summit in Houston, Texas, on October 31, 1976. Side two is made up of previously released material from Clinton's solo albums, including the hit single "Atomic Dog".

In conjunction with the release of The Mothership Connection — Live from Houston, a videotape of the live performance was released. The video also included music videos for several studio tracks. The live performance was released in its entirety in 1998 by Pioneer Artists.

Track listing
Side one - Choice Excerpts From The Mothership Connection
Let's Take It To The Stage / Do That Stuff - 6:55
Mothership Connection / Doctor Funkenstein - 8:19
Get Off Your Ass And Jam / Night Of The Thumpasorous People - 8:50

Side 2 - Choice Excerpts From Previously Released Albums
Atomic Dog - 4:15
Double Oh-Oh - 5:47
Bulletproof - 6:19

See also

George Clinton: The Mothership Connection

External links
 The Mothership Connection - Live from Houston at Discogs

George Clinton (funk musician) albums
1986 albums
Capitol Records albums